Tomasz Bobel (born 29 December 1974 in Wrocław) is a Polish former professional footballer who played as a goalkeeper.

References

External links
 
 

1974 births
Living people
Sportspeople from Wrocław
Association football goalkeepers
Polish footballers
Śląsk Wrocław players
SC Fortuna Köln players
MSV Duisburg players
FC Erzgebirge Aue players
Bayer 04 Leverkusen players
Bayer 04 Leverkusen II players
Neftçi PFK players
Ekstraklasa players
2. Bundesliga players
Oberliga (football) players
Azerbaijan Premier League players
Polish expatriate footballers
Polish expatriate sportspeople in Germany
Expatriate footballers in Germany
Polish expatriate sportspeople in Azerbaijan
Expatriate footballers in Azerbaijan